Rodolph Niamen Amessan (born 27 September 1990), known as Christo, is an Ivorian professional footballer who plays as a winger for Cypriot club Ayia Napa.

Career
Christo signed for Olhanense, playing in the Campeonato de Portugal, for the 2017–18 season. On 23 May 2019, it was announced that Christo had joined ASIL Lysi of the Cypriot Second Division. After making seven appearances, he left the club on 2 January 2020 to join Ayia Napa, also in the Second Division.

References

External links
 
 
 
 

1990 births
Living people
Ivorian footballers
Footballers from Abidjan
Association football wingers
Associação Académica de Coimbra – O.A.F. players
G.D. Tourizense players
S.C. Covilhã players
US Créteil-Lusitanos players
F.C. Arouca players
Ethnikos Achna FC players
C.F. União players
F.C. Famalicão players
U.D. Leiria players
Racing FC Union Luxembourg players
S.C. Olhanense players
Onisilos Sotira players
ASIL Lysi players
Ayia Napa FC players
Primeira Liga players
Liga Portugal 2 players
Campeonato de Portugal (league) players
Segunda Divisão players
Championnat National players
Cypriot First Division players
Cypriot Second Division players
Luxembourg Division of Honour players
Ivorian expatriate footballers
Expatriate footballers in Portugal
Ivorian expatriate sportspeople in Portugal
Expatriate footballers in France
Ivorian expatriate sportspeople in France
Expatriate footballers in Cyprus
Ivorian expatriate sportspeople in Cyprus
Expatriate footballers in Luxembourg